The russet-tailed thrush (Zoothera heinei) is a species of bird in the family Turdidae, closely related to the more widespread Bassian thrush (Zoothera lunulata). It is found in eastern Australia and Papua New Guinea.

Its natural habitats are temperate forests and subtropical or tropical moist lowland forests.

References

russet-tailed thrush
Birds of Queensland
Birds of Papua New Guinea
russet-tailed thrush
Taxonomy articles created by Polbot
Taxa named by Jean Cabanis